The 1894 Pittsburgh Athletic Club football season  was their fifth season in existence. The team finished with a record of 4–4.

Schedule

Game notes

References

Pittsburgh Athletic Club
Pittsburgh Athletic Club football seasons
Pittsburgh Athletic Club football